Edris Anthony "Tony" Hapgood (1930–2011) was an English professional association footballer who played as a winger. The son of Arsenal and England great Eddie Hapgood, he played in the Football League for Burnley and Watford during the 1950s.

References

1930 births
2011 deaths
Sportspeople from Kettering
English footballers
Association football midfielders
Burnley F.C. players
Watford F.C. players
Ashford United F.C. players
Chatham Town F.C. players
English Football League players